Lisa Black (born 1982) is a sculpture artist and jeweller based in Auckland, New Zealand. Her work often combines taxidermied animals and preserved insects with found metal and sometimes working mechanical parts, and has been described as "Steampunk" art, although she does not use the term herself. She self categorizes her work by adding "Fixed" to the titles of her pieces made to look living, and "Departed" to the pieces made to look deceased.  The first work in the Fixed series was Fixed Fawn.
Her work has been featured in Marie Claire Magazine, The New Zealand Herald, and the television show New Zealand's Next Top Model.

Taxidermy works

Fixed series
A series of sculptures using taxidermied animals and metal parts from different eras.
Fixed Mammals, including Fixed Fawn, Fixed Golden Fawn, Fixed Ferret and Fixed Rat.
Fixed Reptiles, including Fixed Crocodile and Fixed Turtle.
Fixed Birds, including Fixed Duckling Head and Fixed Black Bird.
Fixed Pheasant Wings, a taxidermy work not part of the other series.

Departed series
A series of sculptures using the taxidermied skulls of animals and metal parts.

Jewelry
Gilded Butterflies necklaces

Selected exhibitions
 2012 'Rogue Taxidermy', La Luz de Jesus Gallery Hollywood, California
 2011 Museo Civico di Zoologia Rome, Italy
 2011 STRYCHNIN Gallery Berlin, Germany
 2011 Simon James Design, Auckland, New Zealand
 2010 Century Guild Gallery/San Diego Comic-Con International, San Diego, USA
 2009 Century Guild Gallery/San Diego Comic-Con International, San Diego, USA
 2009 'Creature Discomforts', The Suter Gallery, Nelson, New Zealand
 2008  Satellite Gallery, Auckland, New Zealand

References

External links
 
 YouBentMyWookie.com Interview "Lisa Black: Finding Art In The Death of The Cute and Furry" 
 Gizmodo.com
 Creepy Steampunk Animals Put the “Erm?” in Taxidermy, Wired.com

Steampunk
1982 births
Living people
20th-century New Zealand women artists
21st-century New Zealand women artists
20th-century New Zealand sculptors
21st-century New Zealand sculptors
Taxidermists